Cicero Mitchell was a blacksmith and state legislator in Mississippi. He was born in North Carolina.  He represented Holmes County, Mississippi in the Mississippi House of Representatives from 1870 to 1871 and in 1878.

In 1869 he was elected with fellow "Radical Republicans" from Holmes County to the state house.

See also
African-American officeholders during and following the Reconstruction era

References

19th-century American politicians
Members of the Mississippi House of Representatives
Year of birth missing
Year of death missing